This is the list of international prime ministerial trips made by António Costa, who is serving as the 119th Prime Minister of Portugal since 26 November 2015.

2016 

 Cape Verde
 Germany
 Greece
 France
 Brazil

See also 

 Foreign relations of Portugal

References 

António Costa
Costa
Foreign relations of Portugal
Lists of diplomatic trips
2010s in Portuguese politics
2020s in Portuguese politics
Costa
2020s politics-related lists